Beth Shalom Synagogue is a Conservative synagogue located at 11916 Jasper Avenue in the Oliver neighbourhood in Edmonton, Alberta, Canada. Founded in 1932, it is the city's second oldest synagogue.

Edmonton's first rabbi was Hyman Goldstick, recruited from Toronto in 1906; he was later elected mayor of Edson, Alberta. The congregation's Hebrew school, founded in 1907, would share space with the congregation until 1925, and later became Canada's first Jewish day school.

In 1928, because the existing Beth Israel was overcrowded, a group of men and women decided to hold High Holiday services in the hall of the Talmud Torah, which had been built on 103rd street, just south of the Hudson's Bay Company in 1925. The Beth Israel supplied a cantor and a reader. The idea of a new congregation that would have a more modern approach where men and women sat together was conceived. On October 14, 1932, under the direction of J.H. Samuels, the congregation was formally organized and Rabbi Jacob Eisen was hired as spiritual leader. He gave the synagogue its name, Beth Shalom. After the Second World War, under the direction of Rabbi Leon Hurwitz, a Men's Club and Sisterhood were organized.

The concept of a new synagogue building was suggested by H.A (Harry) Friedman and M.I. (Moe) Lieberman with other leaders in the congregation. They began fund raising and bought the lots on Jasper Avenue between 119 Street and 120 Street. The fundraising began in 1943 but the organizers decided to put the funds towards the war effort. The sod turning for the new Beth Shalom building took place on September 15, 1950, and the congregation began to use the partially finished building on April 23, 1951.

Early history
Edmonton had only sixteen Jews living in it in 1901, but the Jewish population grew rapidly as a result of immigration from Eastern Europe, and in-migration from small towns and Jewish agricultural colonies in Alberta and Saskatchewan. In 1906, Edmonton's Jews, in concert with Jews in Calgary, began recruiting in eastern Canada for a rabbi to organize their communities. Hyman Goldstick arrived from Toronto in August to take on the role. Born in Latvia in 1882, Goldstick was Edmonton's first rabbi, and also served as Calgary's rabbi. He was also the Edmonton community's mohel (circumciser), and ritual slaughterer (subsequent rabbis would, for decades, also fill all three roles). On September 16, 1906, the Edmonton Jewish community founded the Edmonton Hebrew Association. Its role was to provide for all Edmonton's Jewish needs, including Jewish education, circumcision, prayer services, kosher meat, and burial. High Holiday services were held in the Independent Order of Odd Fellows hall.

In April 1907, the Edmonton Hebrew Association registered the Edmonton Hebrew Congregation of Beth Israel under the Religious Societies Lands Act of Alberta. In May of that year it purchased land for a cemetery, near Clover Bar, in Edmonton's east end. In September of that same year William Diamond was appointed president of the congregation. Diamond ran a clothing business he had started in Edmonton. Diamond would serve as congregational president until 1938, the same year the synagogue transferred title of its cemetery to the local chevra kadisha (burial society).

In September 1907, the Edmonton Hebrew Association also created the Edmonton Talmud Torah for the community's five children, and purchased its first Torah scroll. The Edmonton Talmud Torah would operate out of the synagogue's location for over twelve years, and later became Canada's first Jewish day school.

See also
 History of the Jews in Canada

Notes

References

1932 establishments in Alberta
Conservative synagogues in Canada
Synagogues completed in 1951
Jewish organizations established in 1932
Synagogues in Edmonton
20th-century religious buildings and structures in Canada